The 2023 F4 Brazilian Championship will be the second season of the F4 Brazilian Championship. It will be a multi-event motor racing championship for open wheel, formula racing cars regulated according to FIA Formula 4 regulations. The championship uses Tatuus F4 T-421 chassis.

Teams and drivers

Race calendar 
The schedule was revealed on 1 February 2023. All rounds will be held in Brazil and all but one will support the 2023 Stock Car Pro Series events. One round will support the 2023 São Paulo Grand Prix.

Notes

References

External links
 

Brazilian F4
Brazilian F4
F4
Brazilian F4